The 2020 UCI Women's World Tour was a competition that initially included twenty-one road cycling events throughout the 2020 women's cycling season. It was the fifth edition of the ranking system launched by the Union Cycliste Internationale (UCI) in 2016. The competition began with the Cadel Evans Great Ocean Road Race Women on 1 February. The schedule was extensively affected by the COVID-19 pandemic, which resulted in two-thirds of the races on the calendar being either postponed or cancelled outright. As a result, the season was extended until 8 November, when the final stage of the Ceratizit Challenge by la Vuelta took place.

Deignan won consecutive races in August at the GP de Plouay and La Course by Le Tour de France, before adding a season-high third victory at Liège–Bastogne–Liège. Deignan finished 55 points clear of her  team mate Elisa Longo Borghini; Longo Borghini failed to win any overall classifications, recording a best finish of second place at the season-ending Ceratizit Challenge by la Vuelta. She also finished in third place at the Giro Rosa, and had six other top-ten finishes during the season. Lisa Brennauer of  finished third in the overall classification with 1424.67 points, after recording podium finishes in three of the season's final four races: third at Gent–Wevelgem, second at the Three Days of Bruges–De Panne, and victory at the Ceratizit Challenge by la Vuelta. From the 11 individual events, a total of 8 riders won races while the World Tour lead was held during the season by Liane Lippert, Deignan and Anna van der Breggen, who was the only other rider to win multiple races, at the Giro Rosa and La Flèche Wallonne.

With 28 points, Lippert was the winner of the youth classification for riders under the age of 23. Lippert led the classification from start to finish, having scored points in each of the first seven races on the schedule, including her overall victory at the season-opening Cadel Evans Great Ocean Road Race – the only race to be held prior to the COVID-19 pandemic-enforced stoppage of racing. Second place in the standings went to Mikayla Harvey with 22 points, who won the classification 3 times during the season, however her season was cut short following the disbandment of  due to financial issues. Lorena Wiebes, the defending champion of the classification, finished third, following victories in each of the final two races. For the first time,  won the teams classification, with a total of 4380.98 points and Deignan's three victories.

Events
For the 2020 season, the calendar consisted of 21 races, down from 23 in 2019. The RideLondon Classique lost its place in the Women's World Tour due to scheduling conflicts resulting from the Olympic races, and the Emakumeen Euskal Bira and Tour of California was cancelled due to financial pressures.

Due to the COVID-19 pandemic, the UCI announced that all UCI races in China in April and May would be cancelled or rescheduled, including the Tour of Chongming Island. Due to further outbreaks in Italy, Strade Bianche was postponed to an undetermined date, Trofeo Alfredo Binda-Comune di Cittiglio was delayed until June. On 12 March, the Ronde van Drenthe was cancelled due to the COVID-19 pandemic in the Netherlands. while all Belgian races were cancelled until 3 April, removing the Three Days of Bruges–De Panne (postponed to a later date), and Gent–Wevelgem from the schedule. The following day, The Women's Tour was postponed due to the COVID-19 pandemic in the United Kingdom. Three Belgian races were postponed on 17 March, with the Amstel Gold Race also postponed the following day. By mid-April, only one race had been completed, while thirteen other races had been either postponed or cancelled outright; no racing was rescheduled before July.

On 5 May 2020, a revised calendar was announced by the UCI, with 18 races to be held between 1 August and 8 November, including the introduction of a women's Paris–Roubaix. In June, in line with the men's race, the Tour of Guangxi was moved from 20 October to 10 November.

Cancelled events
Three events that were initially postponed in the first half of 2020, due to the COVID-19 pandemic, were not able to rescheduled during the season; these were the Ronde van Drenthe due to be held on 15 March, the Trofeo Alfredo Binda-Comune di Cittiglio due to be held on 2 June (initially 22 March), and The Women's Tour due to be held from 8 to 13 June.

Following the release of the revised calendar on 5 May, the Postnord UCI WWT Vårgårda West Sweden TTT and Postnord UCI WWT Vårgårda West Sweden, scheduled for 8 and 9 August, were cancelled on 14 May. The Ladies Tour of Norway, scheduled between 13–16 August, was cancelled on 4 June. The Holland Ladies Tour, scheduled for 1–6 September (initially 25–30 August), was cancelled on 27 July. In August, the Chinese races at the Tour of Chongming Island (23–25 October, initially 7–9 May) and the Tour of Guangxi (10 November, initially 20 October) were cancelled. On 30 September, the Amstel Gold Race (initially scheduled for 19 April, and then rescheduled to 10 October), was cancelled following a surge of cases attributed to the COVID-19 pandemic in the Netherlands. On 9 October, the inaugural Paris–Roubaix (scheduled for 25 October) was delayed until 2021, following a surge of cases attributed to the COVID-19 pandemic in France.

Points standings
For the 2020 season, a revised point-scoring system was introduced by the Union Cycliste Internationale (UCI). As had been the case since 2018, the top 40 riders in each race accumulated points towards the individual and team rankings. Instead of receiving 200 points, each race winner received 400 points, 320 points were given for a runner-up placing, 260 points for third place and so forth down to 8 points for finishes between 31st and 40th. There were also tweaks to the stage points and points for wearing the leader's jersey in stage races.

Individual

Riders tied with the same number of points were classified by number of victories, then number of second places, third places, and so on, in World Tour events and stages.

Youth

The top three riders in the final results of each World Tour event's young rider classification received points towards the standings. Six points were awarded to first place, four points to second place and two points to third place.

Team
Team rankings were calculated by adding the ranking points of all the riders of a team in the table.

Notes

References

External links

 
2020 in women's road cycling
2020 in road cycling
UCI Women's World Tour
UCI Women's World Tour